The 2015–16 Leinster Senior Cup, was the 115th staging of the Leinster Senior Cup association football competition.

Preliminary round
Eleven junior clubs, ten junior league winners plus the FAI Junior Cup winners, were entered into this round by a draw. Byes were given to 5 of these clubs. Winners progress to the first round.

First round
The three winners from the preliminary round join the five clubs who received byes.

Second round
The 4 winners from the first round join the top 2 teams from the 2014–15 Athletic Union League Premier A.

Third round
The 3 winners from the second round join the top 5 teams from the 2014–15 Leinster Senior League Senior Division.

Fourth round
The 4 winners from the third round join the 12 Leinster teams from the League of Ireland.

Quarter finals

Semi finals

Final

References

2015
2015 in Republic of Ireland association football cups
2016 in Republic of Ireland association football cups